Zinc finger protein 439 is a protein that in humans is encoded by the ZNF439 gene.

References

Further reading 

Human proteins